Malenkovskaya is a train station on the Yaroslavsky suburban railway line in Moscow, Russia. It is located on the border of Eastern and North-Eastern Administrative Okrugs,  from Yaroslavsky railway terminal.

There are exits at the Rizhsky Proezd and 4 Luchevoy Prosek in the Sokolniki Park.

References

Railway stations in Moscow
Railway stations of Moscow Railway
Railway stations in the Soviet Union opened in 1934